The Diocese of Western Anglicans is an Anglican Church in North America founding diocese. It has 38 congregations in the American states of California, Arizona, Nevada, Utah, Idaho, Montana, Washington, and Wyoming. The state with most congregations is California with 20, followed by Arizona with 8. Its headquarters are located in Long Beach, California. Their first bishop was the Right Rev. William "Bill" Thompson, who resigned in 2014. He was succeeded as Vicar General by the Right Rev. Frank Lyons in June 2014.

The process that led to the birth of the diocese was started when 14 parishes from Southern California and Arizona, who had left The Episcopal Church and were under the supervision of the Anglican Church of the Southern Cone of America and the Church of Uganda, held a meeting of 60 delegates in June 2007. They adopted the Theological Statement of the Common Cause Partnership and elected an Executive Committee. In October 2007, at the reunion of the House of the Delegates it was decided to launch the Association of Western Anglicans Congregations and the Diocese of Western Anglicans as a diocese-in-formation. They joined the Common Cause Partnership in 2008 and formed the new diocese who was recognized as a member of the Anglican Church in North America in their Provincial Assembly held in Dallas, Texas, in April 2009. The diocese had then 21 parishes and an average Sunday attendance of 2,000. Rev. William Thompson was elected the diocesan bishop at the College of Bishops of the first Provincial Assembly of the ACNA in 19–20 June 2009. On October 10, 2014, the Anglican Church of North America elected Keith Andrews as the second bishop of the diocese. He was consecrated on January 25, 2015, at St. Andrew's Presbyterian Church, in Newport Beach, California.

References

External links
Diocese of Western Anglicans Official Website

Dioceses of the Anglican Church in North America
Anglican dioceses established in the 21st century
Anglican realignment dioceses
Protestantism in California
Protestantism in Arizona